Monte Orditano is a mountain in Liguria, northern Italy, part of the Ligurian Apennines.

Geography 
The mountain lies at an altitude of 950 metres.
It's located in the town of Ceranesi in the Province of Genoa, not far from the border with Piedmont.

References

Mountains of Liguria
Mountains under 1000 metres
Mountains of the Apennines